Andrijana Janevska (born December 6, 1981) is a famous Macedonian singer and musician.

Biography

Janevska was born in Skopje, SR Macedonia, Yugoslavia (in present-day North Macedonia) where she currently works and lives. Her occupation is a violinist for the Macedonian National Opera. In addition to her musical talents, Andrijana also enjoys playing chess as a hobby. She is also proficient in playing the piano and her first composition was created at the age of 11. Andrijana started her studies in the School Centre for Music Education in Skopje at the age of 6, and recently finished her master studies at the Faculty of Arts in Skopje.

Andrijana Janevska's talent was first exposed to the public in 1998, when she took part in SkopjeFest. In October the next year, Andrijana was voted the best newcomer in the annual Makfest festival in Stip. At the festival, she sang a sensual ballad called "Ne mozam da zaljubam po tebe" ("I Can't Fall in Love After You"). Her festival awards did not end there as she competed in the Macedonian festival, Eurofest, and achieved the respectable second place with the song "Da sum juzen vetar" ("To Be A Southern Wind"). In February 2000, Andrijana Jenevska competed in SkopjeFest once again, only this time she was competing for a Eurovision selection to compete in Stockholm, Sweden. At the festival, she sang the well received song called "Tvoeto pismo, moja biblija" ("Your Letter, My Bible") and with this composition, she had a huge hit in Macedonia despite her failure to win the competition.

Andrijana's popularity led to her getting signed at the "Abra Kadabra" music label, which sent Andrijana to Cyprus to film her music video for her new single "Ljuboven ritam" ("Love Rhythm"), which she would compete with in the Montenegrin festival, Budva 2000. The cooperation between Andrijana and "Abra Kadabra" did not last long and finally ended when Andrijana terminated the agreement and joined the production of Macedonian Radio Television while continuing the direction of the music videos with another production label. During the summer of 2000, Andrijana spent her time in Australia as part of the Macedonian expedition to other continents. In October, Andrijana participated in Makfest as part of a duet with Marjan Stojanovski for the song "Ljubov ti e adresa" ("Love Is Your Address"). The song became a hit among the public and with their votes, the song triumphed in first place. After this, Andrijana filmed her music video with Stojanovski and returned to her first ambition of playing the violin, which was evident in her new songs. In March 2001, with the hit "Nostalgija" ("Nostalgia") Andrijana got first place from the public, first place from the jury, and the festival's Grand-Prix at SkopjeFest. In July, Andrijana took part in the Muf + Boban 2001 festival in Zrenjanin and began her promotion for the new album "Moja Biblija", which contained some new and some old songs, 12 of which were included in the album. Andrijana's fondness of duets made her dedicate the song, "Odovde do vechnosta" ("From Here to Eternity") which she sang with opera singer Blagoj Nacoski, to her fans.

Andrijana Janevska competed in SkopjeFest 2002, this time wishing to reach the Eurovision stage in Tallinn, Estonia. Her song "O Cherie, Mon Cherie" was a strong favourite to win the competition, however the audience and the jury both placed Andrijana in second place. After this, Andrijana took a long break from the music scene.

After three years of absence, Andrijana Janevska returned to the Macedonian music scene in October, participating in Makfest 2004. She competed with the rock song "Ostani" ("Stay"), and placed 7th. Andrijana Janevska was later interviewed and revealed that she is trying new music styles and that she is currently focused on rock music. At the end of 2004, Andrijana participated in SkopjeFest with "Za Kraj" ("For The End"), which because of its immense popularity was later released as a single with a music video. Andrijana announced that she will release a new album in the near future and that she has songs already prepared for promotion. In the summer of 2005, Andrijana participated in Ohrid Fest with the song "Dojdi Bakni Me" ("Come And Kiss Me"), where she won the third place overall. After that, Andrijana continued her comeback participating again in Makfest 2005, with the song "Zvezda Vodilka" ("Guiding Star"), where she was successful at gaining more media interest.

In 2006, Andrijana revealed that she will record some songs in the reggae style of music. In June, she released her new reggae single called "Den" ("Day"). Andrijana confirmed that she would participate in this year's Ohrid Fest. Andrijana performed "Sonce" ("Sun") during the Pop music night of Ohrid Fest on August 25. She got sufficient points to proceed to the International evening where she was successful although not placing in the top 3. In addition to competing, Andrijana had also promoted her upcoming album called "Den". It was recently revealed that Andrijana had recorded a song with Eva Nedinkoska called "Tivka Nok" ("Quiet Night"), which will is due to be released along with a videoclip.

Andrijana Janevska made a return to the Skopje Fest contest, which took place on February 24, 2007. The contest acted as the National Final of Macedonia for the Eurovision Song Contest.

In 2009 the follow-up of the CD with traditional Macedonian songs titled "Prikazna za edno mome" ("Story for one Sheila") was released and once again it was produced by Mite Dimovski. The following year in collaboration with MED Macedonia, she released the Christian CD with Christmas songs for children titled "Dzvezdichka mala" ("Little Star"). In 2011 in collaboration with Tanja Veda she released the children's CD "Koga si srekjen" ("When you are happy") that contains 15 songs from the English speaking regions, translated and sang in Macedonian.

In 2009, Janevska married guitarist of the band Archangel, Dragan Ginovski Gino, who she had been dating for 4 years. In 2011 she became mother of little Dimitar, and the following year she returned onstage with the appearance at the Skopje Festival where she performed the composition “Mozebi” (“Maybe”). Andrijana is the author of the music, text and arrangement of this song.

She was full-time professor teaching violin for two years in the music school in Kumanovo, she was teaching for one year at the University of Audiovisual Arts European Film and Theatre Academy ESRA- Paris-Skopje-New York, almost 7 years she is teaching solfeggio, theory of music, singing and piano in the musical school “Enterprajz” and since 2003 Janevska has been an active member of the women's chamber choir "St. Zlata Meglenska". Janevska is a professor in the music department at the Faculty of Music Arts in Skopje, as well as a composer. Though she has written many of the songs she sings, she also sings works by other composers.

In 2014, Janevska performed at the World Choir Competition in Riga, winning two gold and one silver medal with the St. Zlata Meglenska Choir. Their choir, the only one from Macedonia was among 570 competing international singing groups. That same year, she and her husband had their second son.
Her biggest hobby is playing chess and she was a spokesperson for the Chess Federation of the Republic of Macedonia for one year, as a member of the chess club "Gambit".

Albums
 Moja Biblija – 2001
 Den – 2006
 Makedonski Rozi (Etno with MITAN) – 2008
 Prikazna za edno mome (Etno with MITAN) – 2009
 Dzvezdichka mala (Christian songs) – 2010
 Koga si srekjen (Children songs) – 2011
 Patuvanje na polnokj (Etno with MITAN) – 2013
 Zaspivalki (Children's lullabies) – 2015

Singles
 Te sakam beskrajno (duet with Pece Ognenov) – 1998
 Dovolno silna – 1998
 Eden den – 1999
 Se shto baram nokjva – 1999
 Ne mozam da zaljubam po tebe – 1999
 Da sum juzen vetar – 1999
 Tvoeto pismo, moja biblija – 2000
 Ljuboven ritam – 2000
 Ljubov ti e adresa (duet with Marjan Stojanovski) – 2000
 Za tebe – 2000
 Nostalgija – 2001
 Od ovde do vechnosta (duet with Blagoj Nacoski) – 2001
 Den po den (duet with Vrchak) – 2001
 Svoja na svoeto – 2001
 O Cherie, Mon Cherie – 2002
 Ostani – 2004
 Za Kraj – 2005
 Dojdi Bakni Me – 2005
 Dzvezda Vodilka – 2005
 Den – 2006
 Sonce – 2006
 Epizoda – 2007
 Tivka nokj (duet with Tanja Stankovic Dimovska) – 2007
 Tivka Nokj (duet with Eva) – 2007
 Zrno – 2008
 Zaminuvam – 2008
 Vo pogreshno vreme – 2008
 Drvo bez koren – 2009
 20 leta Makedonijo – 2011
 Mozhebi – 2012
 Zhivotot e ubav – 2013
 Ako me sakash (ft. Infinitas) – 2013
 Shto e toa – 2013
 Kazna – 2014
 Eden den (duet with Myatta) – 2014

See also
 Music of the Republic of Macedonia

References

External links
 

1981 births
Living people
Musicians from Skopje
Macedonian pop singers
Macedonian rock singers
21st-century Macedonian women singers
Macedonian folk-pop singers